Saint-Gervais-sur-Roubion (Vivaro-Alpine: Sant Gervais de Robion) is a commune in the Drôme department in southeastern France.

Population

See also
Communes of the Drôme department

References

Communes of Drôme